Menke-Hennekam syndrome is a rare condition characterised by a constellation of lesions mostly involving the brain.

Signs and symptoms

The feature of this condition include
 Microcephaly
 Ventriculomegaly
 Absent corpus callosum
 Autistic behavior
 Feeding problems
 Epilepsy
 Variable intellectual disability
 Staphyloma
 Cochlear malformations
 Mild hearing impairment
 Exomphalos
 Short stature
 Recurrent upper airway infections

Genetics

This condition has been associated with mutations in the CREB binding protein gene (CREBBP). This gene is located on the short arm of chromosome 16 (16p13.3).

Pathopysiology

The pathogenesis of this condition is not understood.

Diagnosis

This syndrome may be suspected on clinical grounds. The diagnosis is established by sequencing the CREBBP gene.

Differential diagnosis
 Rubinstein-Taybi syndrome

Treatment

There is no specific treatment for this condition. Management is supportive.

Epidemiology

This condition is considered to be rare with less than 20 cases reported in the literature.

History

This condition was first described in 2019.

References

Genetic diseases and disorders
Rare syndromes
Autosomal dominant disorders